Rassvet is a rural locality (a selo) and the administrative centre of Rassvetovsky Selsoviet, Davlekanovsky District, Bashkortostan, Russia. The population was 390 as of 2010. There are 6 streets.

Geography 
Rassvet is located 15 km northwest of Davlekanovo (the district's administrative centre) by road. Olgovka is the nearest rural locality.

References 

Rural localities in Davlekanovsky District